Abu Abd Allah Mohammed ibn Abi al-Qasim al-Sijilmasi was a Moroccan Maliki scholar. He is especially well known for his Sharh al-amal al-mutlaq: al-musammá bi-Fath al-jalīl al-samad fī sharh al-takmīl wa-al-mutamad. It was finished in 1782. According to al-Hajwi, Sijilmasi died of the plague in Boujad on the i ith of Shawwal 1214/1800.

References

See also
Abd al-Rahman al-Fasi
Ali ibn Qasim al-Zaqqaq

Moroccan writers
Moroccan Maliki scholars
1800 deaths
People from Sijilmasa
18th-century Moroccan people
Year of birth missing